Good Riddance / Kill Your Idols is a split EP by the hardcore punk bands Good Riddance and Kill Your Idols, released on November 20, 2001, by Jade Tree.

Reception 
Johnny Loftus of Allmusic gave the EP three and a half stars out of five, remarking that "[Good Riddance's] tightly wound sound is well represented here; 'Judas and the Morning After Pill' and 'Grandstanding from the Cheap Seats' have an urgent punk traditionalism about them that's reminiscent of Bad Religion. For their part, Kill Your Idols prove that the rabid, ragged-edges sound of New York City's defiant hardcore scene is still going strong."

Track listing

Personnel

Good Riddance 
 Russ Rankin – vocals
 Luke Pabich – guitar
 Chuck Platt – bass guitar
 Dave Wagenschutz – drums
 Bill Stevenson – producer, recording and mix engineer
 Stephen Egerton – producer, recording and mix engineer
 Jason Livermore – producer, recording and mix engineer, mastering

Kill Your Idols 
 Andy West – vocals
 Gary Bennett – guitar
 Brian Meehan – guitar
 Paul Delaney – bass guitar
 Raeph Glicken – drums
 Arik Victor – recording engineer
 Mike Bardzik – recording engineer

References

External links 
 Good Riddance / Kill Your Idols at Jade Tree

2001 EPs
Good Riddance (band) EPs
Kill Your Idols albums
Jade Tree (record label) EPs